Bani Matar District is a district of the Sanaa Governorate, Yemen. , the district had a population of 100,012 inhabitants.

Environment

In this district is located Jabal An-Nabi Shu'ayb or Jabal Hadhur of the Harazi subrange of the Sarat range, the highest mountain in Yemen and the Arabian Peninsula.

References

Districts of Sanaa Governorate
Bani Matar District